April Bernard (born 1956) is an American poet. She was born and raised in New England, and graduated from Harvard University.   She has worked as a senior editor at Vanity Fair, Premiere, and Manhattan, inc. In the early 1990s, she taught at Amherst College.  In Fall 2003, she was Sidney Harman Writer-in-Residence at Baruch College.  She currently teaches at Skidmore College in Saratoga Springs, New York. Her work has appeared in The New Yorker, the Boston Review, AGNI, Ploughshares, Parnassus, and The New York Review of Books.

Honors and awards
 2003 Guggenheim Fellowship
 2006 Stover Memorial Prize in Poetry

Published works
Full-Length Poetry Collections
 
 
 
 
 

Novels
 
 

Anthology Publications

References

External links
 "Interview: April Bernard", Reb Livingston, Post Road Magazine, Issue 7 
 Audio: April Bernard reads "Beagle or Something"  from Romanticism: Poems (2009)
 Audio: April Bernard reads "Heimatlos"  from Romanticism: Poems (2009)
 
 "Song of Yes and No", Baruch College
 
 
 
 
 

1956 births
Living people
20th-century American novelists
21st-century American novelists
Poets from Vermont
American women poets
American women novelists
Amherst College faculty
Baruch College faculty
Bennington College faculty
Harvard Advocate alumni
People from Bennington, Vermont
The New Yorker people
Novelists from Vermont
20th-century American women writers
21st-century American women writers
20th-century American poets
21st-century American poets
Novelists from Massachusetts
Novelists from New York (state)
American women academics